The Aruba national badminton team represents Aruba in international badminton team competitions and is controlled by the Aruba Badminton Federation in Oranjestad. The team first competed in their first international team tournament in 1990.

History

Mixed team 
The Aruban mixed team first competed in the 1990 Central American and Caribbean Games team event. The team were eliminated in the group stages.

Competitive record

Central American and Caribbean Games

Mixed team

Junior competitive record

Pan Am Junior Team Championships

Mixed team

U19

CAREBACO Junior Team Championships

Mixed team

U19

Players

Current squad

Men's team

Women's team

References 

Badminton
National badminton teams